Parazenidae is a family of zeiform fishes found in the Atlantic and Pacific Oceans.

References

Zeiformes
Ray-finned fish families